Peter Bush or Pete Bush may refer to:

Sports
Peter Bush (badminton), English badminton player, in Hungarian International
Peter Bush (wrestler), American sport wrestler, see Wrestling at the 1983 Pan American Games
Pete Bush from Iowa Hawkeyes wrestling

Others
Peter Bush (businessman) (born 1952), Australian businessman
Pete Bush, keyboardist from the band Toyah
Peter Bush (translator) (born 1946), British translator
Peter Bush (photographer) (born 1930), New Zealand photojournalist
Peter Bush, actor in I Was a Teenage Zombie